Mounir Sabet (sometimes spelled Mounir Thabet) (born 29 October 1936) is an Egyptian general and sports official.

Born in the Upper Egyptian city of Qena, Mounir Sabet is the son of Saleh Sabet, an Egyptian pediatrician, and his Welsh wife Lily May Palmer. Mounir Sabet's sister Suzanne is the wife of former Egyptian President Hosni Mubarak, thus the former First Lady of Egypt.

Mounir Sabet was a member of the 1965 Egyptian national shooting team. He served as president of the Egyptian Olympic Committee from 1990 to 1993, and again from 1996 to 2009. He was a member of the International Olympic Committee from 1998 to 2016 and became an Honorary Member in 2017.

See also
List of members of the International Olympic Committee

References

1936 births
Egyptian generals
Egyptian people of Welsh descent
Egyptian male sport shooters
International Olympic Committee members
Living people
People from Qena
Mubarak family